Shiri is a rural locality (a village) in Permasskoye Rural Settlement, Nikolsky District, Vologda Oblast, Russia. The population was 51 as of 2002.

Geography 
Shiri is located 35 km south of Nikolsk (the district's administrative centre) by road. Permas is the nearest rural locality.

References 

Rural localities in Nikolsky District, Vologda Oblast